The Copa Petrobras Argentina was a tennis tournament held in Buenos Aires, Argentina since 2004. The event is part of the ''challenger series and is played on outdoor clay courts.

Past finals

Singles

Doubles

External links 
Official website
ITF search

ATP Challenger Tour
Sports competitions in Buenos Aires
Tennis tournaments in Argentina
Clay court tennis tournaments